The plain-mantled tit-spinetail (Leptasthenura aegithaloides) is a small passerine bird of South America belonging to the ovenbird family, Furnariidae. It is a common bird across much of Chile, southern and eastern Argentina, southern Peru and western Bolivia. It occurs from 0 to 4,300 metres above sea level in a variety of habitats including arid country, open woodland, forest edge, scrub, grassland, parks and gardens. It forages among leaves and branches, searching for insects.

It is 15 to 18 cm in length with the long, pointed tail feathers accounting for much of this. The bill is short and pointed and the wings are short and rounded. The plumage varies among the four subspecies. The nominate subspecies L. a. aegithaloides of central Chile is mainly brown with paler underparts, rufous markings on the wings and crown and a white stripe above the eye. The head and upper breast are streaked while the back is plain. L. a. berlepschi occurs high in the Andes in the northern part of the species' range and is larger and more buff-coloured than the other forms. L. a. grisescens is found in the arid lowlands of north Chile and south Peru. It is rather greyish in colour with little streaking on the breast. In most of Argentina and south Chile, L. a. pallida occurs. It is pale and greyish with only a small area of rufous in the wing.

The song and calls are loud, buzzy and chattering and vary between the different subspecies.

The nest is built in a hole in a cliff, bank, tree or cactus or in old dome-shaped nests of other birds such as canasteros. The nest is lined with grass and feathers and two to four small, white eggs are laid. The young birds are able to fly within three weeks.

References

Harris, Graham (1998) A Guide to the Birds and Mammals of Coastal Patagonia, Princeton University Press. Retrieved 06/06/07.

External links
Aves de Chile
Pájaros Argentinos 

plain-mantled tit-spinetail
Birds of Peru
Birds of Chile
plain-mantled tit-spinetail
Taxa named by Heinrich von Kittlitz